Post-Soviet studies, also known as post-Soviet area studies or Former Soviet Union (FSU) studies, is a field of study within sociology and political science that emerged out of Soviet studies and Sovietology following the dissolution of the Soviet Union. The field encompasses a broad range of studies in the area of the former Soviet Union, including within Slavic studies and Central Eurasian studies, and the study of specific post-Soviet states, including: Armenianology, Baltic studies, Belarusian studies, Central Asian studies, Georgian studies, Russian studies, Ukrainian studies, and others.

Broader themes in post-Soviet studies include the role of postcolonial analysis, and the relevance of analysis in context of the former Soviet Union as studies of the region progress into the post-Soviet era.

See also

 Europe-Asia Studies

References

Subfields of political science
Dissolution of the Soviet Union
History of the Soviet Union by period
Historiography of the Soviet Union
Politics of the Soviet Union
Russian studies
Slavic studies
European studies
Indo-European studies